The 1980 Geneva Open was a men's tennis tournament played on outdoor clay courts that was part of the 1980 Volvo Grand Prix. It was played at Geneva in Switzerland and was held from 22 September until 28 September 1980. Third-seeded Balázs Taróczy won the singles title.

Finals

Singles

 Balázs Taróczy defeated  Adriano Panatta 6–3, 6–2
 It was Taróczy's 3rd singles title of the year and the 9th of his career.

Doubles

 Željko Franulović /  Balázs Taróczy defeated  Heinz Günthardt /  Markus Günthardt 6–4, 4–6, 6–4
 It was Franulović's only title of the year and the 16th of his career. It was Taróczy's 5th title of the year and the 16th of his career.

References

External links
 ITF tournament edition details

 
20th century in Geneva